Jared Phillip John Sims (born 16 October 1993) is an English footballer who plays as a forward for Mousehole. Born in Truro, he previously played in the Football League for Plymouth Argyle, having progressed through the club's youth system. He later played for a single season at Truro City.

Career
Sims made his professional debut on 9 August 2011, in the Football League Cup 1–0 defeat to Millwall at Home Park. This followed his appearance as an unused substitute in the 1–1 draw away at Shrewsbury the previous Saturday. He signed a new undisclosed contract in April 2012, his first as a professional, along with teammates Curtis Nelson and Luke Young. He helped the club's under-18 team win the South West Conference of the Football League Youth Alliance later that month. He ended his debut season in the first team with four appearances in all competitions. Sims made two more appearances for Argyle before being released at the end of the 2012–13 season.

In June 2013, Sims signed for his home town club Truro City prior to their first season back in the Southern League.

References

External links

1993 births
Sportspeople from Truro
Living people
English footballers
Association football forwards
Plymouth Argyle F.C. players
Truro City F.C. players
A.F.C. St Austell players
St Blazey A.F.C. players
English Football League players